The 2012 European Junior Open Water Swimming Championships was part the 14th edition of the European Open Water Swimming Championships event of the LEN European Aquatics Championships for juniors held in Karamürsel, Kocaeli Province, Turkey from July 13 to 15. The event featured in the Gulf of İzmit at northeastern Marmara Sea for junior (17–18 years) and youth (15–16 years) male and female individuals and team event (youth/junior combined).

Participating nations
117 swimmers (62 males, 55 females) from 21 countries swam at the 2012 European Junior Open Water Swimming Championships.

Medal table

Results

Individual

Team

References

Open water swimming competitions
open water
Swimming competitions in Turkey
Youth sport in Turkey
European Junior Open Water Swimming Championships
Sport in İzmit
Sea of Marmara
2012
2012 in swimming